Caulonia or Caulon (also spelled Kaulonia or Kaulon) was an ancient city of Magna Graecia on the shore of the Ionian Sea. At some point after the destruction of the city by Rome in 200 BC, the inhabitants moved to a location further inland. There they founded Stilida, which developed into the modern town Stilo.

Since 1863 AD the name Caulonia has also been used by the city formerly known as Castelvetere. The city changed its name to Caulonia in honor of the ancient city, which was mistakenly believed to have been located in its territory. Today the ruins of the ancient city can be found near Monasterace in the Province of Reggio Calabria, Calabria, Italy. Some of the artefacts which have been excavated at the site can now be seen in the Monasterace Archeological Museum.

Geography 

The city was located between the mouth of the Stilaro river to the south and the mouth of the Assi river to the north. In ancient times the mouth of the Assi was located slightly further to the south. Punta Stilo, the "Cape of Columns", is a gentle arc-shaped headland located immediately north of the site. In ancient times the shoreline of Caulonia lay 300 meter further seawards. More than one hundred fluted columns which have been discovered on the seabed in front of Caulonia stood then on a broad arc-shaped headland. This headland probably did not have natural or artificial facilities which could provide protected anchorage for ships. The recession of the coastline started around 400 BC and ended in the 1st century AD. It was the result of a tectonic phase which caused landward rise and submergence of the seafloor. The shoreline stabilized in the period from the 1st century AD to the present.

History

Foundation 

There is no literary evidence for the foundation date of Caulonia, but archeological evidence shows that it was founded early in the second half of the seventh century BC. Both Strabo and Pausanias mention that the city was founded by Achaean Greek colonists. Pausanias also gives the name of the oecist, or founder, as Typhon of Aegium. Others sources such as Pseudo-Scymnus claim that it was founded by Croton. A. J. Graham does not consider these two options to be mutually exclusive because the oecist and settlers could have been invited by Croton.

Sixth and fifth centuries BC 
It has been thought that Caulonia was ruled by Croton for some time, but A. J. Graham considers this uncertain. The fact that Caulonia minted its own coins in the sixth century BC suggests that it was independent. Also, the claim of Croton over such a long stretch of coast close to its rival Locri would have been risky. According to Thucydides Caulonia supplied Athens with timber for ships during the Peloponnesian War (431–404 BC). The store of timber at Caulonia was attacked and burned by forces from Syracuse.

Conquest by Syracuse 
In 389 BC the city was conquered by Dionysius I of Syracuse, who transplanted its citizens to Syracuse and gave them citizenship and an exemption from taxes for five years. He then levelled the city to the ground and gave its territory to his ally Locri. Apparently it was refounded by Dionysius II of Syracuse several decades later. Dionysius II probably gave control over the city to Locri. Archaeological evidence confirms that the city was deserted for some time in the fourth century BC. Later in the same century, it was permanently inhabited again.

Roman conquest and abandonment 
This was not the end of misfortune for the city however, for it was razed two more times. It was destroyed during the Pyrrhic War (280–275 BC) and taken by the Campanians, who formed the largest contingent of allies in the army of Rome. In 200 BC the town was completely destroyed by the Romans, when it sided with Hannibal during the Punic Wars. It was probably around this time that the ancient site of Caulonia, directly on the Ionian coast, was abandoned in favor of a more protected site inland. About 200 years later when the city is mentioned by Strabo, it is described by him as "situated before a valley" and deserted.

Archaeology 

The first archaeological excavations were conducted between 1911 and 1913 by Paolo Orsi.

The excavation area is named "Saggio SAS II" and topologically "San Marco nord-est". It is bordered by the Ionian Sea on the east, the Taranto-Reggio Calabria railway on the west, the Assi river on the north and the "casemate" area on the south.

In 1969 a mosaic depicting a dragon was discovered in what is now called the "House of the Dragon". It was first exhibited in the Museo Nazionale della Magna Grecia, but was restored and transferred to the Monasterace Archeological Museum in 2012.

In 2012 the archaeologist Francesco Cuteri and his team discovered a mosaic floor of 25 square meters. Dating to late 4th century BC, it is one of the largest mosaics from the Hellenistic period found in Southern Italy. It was discovered in what is thought to have been a thermal bathhouse. The mosaic is divided into nine polychrome squares and another space with a polychrome rosette at the entrance of the room. It depicts a dragon in its center, comparable to the mosaic discovered in 1969.

On 8 October 2013 the discovery of a bronze tablet from fifth century BC in the urban sanctuary was announced. The tablet has a dedication of eighteen lines written in the Achaean alphabet, the longest Achaean inscription ever discovered in Magna Graecia.

Gallery

References

Sources

Primary sources

Secondary sources

Further reading

External links 

  
 Excavations of Caulonia by the University of Florence 

Achaean colonies of Magna Graecia
Archaeological sites in Calabria
Former populated places in Italy
Vallata dello Stilaro